"Chip" Huggins (born November 30, 1961 in Columbia, South Carolina) is a Republican member of the South Carolina House of Representatives. He has represented his Lexington County district (the 85th) since being elected in 1999 to succeed André Bauer.

Huggins graduated from Winthrop University in 1987, where he was a member of Sigma Alpha Epsilon. He married Ginger E. Gilstrap in 1988 and have two children.

Huggins defeated Richard Eckstrom to win his first election in 1999. He generally runs unopposed, and in 2008 when opposed by Democrat Jim Nelson won 13,122 votes (69.43% of the total) to Nelson's 5,769 (30.52%).

Huggins was opposed by Democrat Sam Edwards in the 2018 midterm election. Edwards received 6,273 votes (33.93%) to Huggins's 12,206 (66.01%).

References

External links 
 
Project VoteSmart: Representative Chip Huggins (SC)

Republican Party members of the South Carolina House of Representatives
Living people
1961 births
21st-century American politicians